The Seberang Perai City Council is the city council which administers Seberang Perai, the mainland half of the Malaysian state of Penang. This agency is under the purview of the Penang state government.

The local council is responsible for urban planning, heritage preservation, public health, sanitation, waste management, traffic management, environmental protection, building control, social and economic development, and general maintenance of urban infrastructure.

And there are two branches of MBSP office cawangan which is in SPU (near Mahkamah) and SPS.

History
Province Wellesley (now Seberang Perai) had been acquired in stages by the British East India Company in the early 19th century. The principal town within Province Wellesley, Butterworth, began to develop sometime in the 1850s.

However, the history of local governance in Seberang Perai only began in earnest towards the end of the 19th century. In 1896, the first Municipal Ordinance was introduced to ensure the smooth administration of Penang's local authorities. Another legislation was passed in 1913, permitting the establishment of three Rural Boards and a Town Board within Province Wellesley.

The four local authorities were: 
 Butterworth Town Board
 Province Wellesley North Rural District Board
 Province Wellesley Central Rural District Board
 Province Wellesley South Rural District Board

The evolution of the local governments in Province Wellesley continued in 1952, when the four local boards were upgraded into local councils. These upgrades took effect within the following year. In addition, the Bukit Mertajam Town Council was formed in 1953, thus increasing the total number of local authorities in Province Wellesley to five. The five local authorities at the time were:
 Butterworth Town Council
 Bukit Mertajam Town Council
 Province Wellesley North Rural District Council
 Province Wellesley Central Rural District Council
 Province Wellesley South Rural District Council

In 1961, both the Butterworth and Bukit Mertajam town councils were merged with their surrounding rural councils, the Province Wellesley North and Central rural councils, respectively. Later on in 1973, the remaining three Rural District Councils were also merged into a single local authority that encompasses all of Seberang Perai, the Seberang Perai Local Government Management Board.

Following the enactment of the Local Government Act 1976, the local board was succeeded by the Seberang Perai Municipal Council.

Since 1976, the Seberang Perai Municipal Council was one of the only two local governments in Penang, alongside the then Penang Island Municipal Council which administered Penang Island, including George Town. In 2015, the Penang Island Municipal Council was succeeded by the present-day Penang Island City Council (MBPP), leaving the Seberang Perai Municipal Council as the sole municipal council in Penang until 2019, when it officially declared as a full fledged city on Malaysia Day, 16 September 2019.

Areas of jurisdiction 
The Seberang Perai City Council administers all three districts of Seberang Perai, as well as the two islets off the coastline of Seberang Perai - Aman Island and Gedung Island. Over  of the mainland half of Penang is therefore under the jurisdiction of the City Council.

List of mayors

Organisation 
The City Council is headed by the Mayor, who is assisted by a City Secretary and 24 councillors. The Mayor's term lasts for two years, while each of the 24 councillors is appointed for a one-year term by the Penang state government.

21 of the councillors are selected by the component parties of the ruling Pakatan Harapan coalition. Of these, nine are appointed by the Democratic Action Party (DAP), eight by the People's Justice Party (PKR), and two each from the National Trust Party (Amanah) and Malaysian United Indigenous Party (Bersatu). Penang-based non-governmental organisations (NGOs) are allocated the remaining three councillor positions to allow for the participation in policy-making by Penang's civil societies.

The current mayor of the Seberang Perai City Council is Azhar Arshad, who assumed office in 2022. At the time of writing, the position of the City Secretary is held by Rosnani Mahmod.

Councillors 
, the councillors of the Seberang Perai City Council are as listed below:

Departments 
The City Council also comprises the following departments and units.

See also
Seberang Perai
Penang Island City Council

References

External links 

 
 iDirektori : Ketua Jabatan

Seberang Perai
Seberang Perai
1976 establishments in Malaysia
City councils in Malaysia